Ulrich Louis Schmidt (also known as Uli Schmidt) (born 10 July 1961 in Pretoria, South Africa) is a former South African rugby union footballer. He later became a Springbok team doctor.

Playing career
Schmidt made his international debut for the Springboks as a 24-year-old on 10 May 1986 in a test against the NZ Cavaliers, which the Springboks won 21 to 15 at Newlands. He played in three subsequent tests against the New Zealand side throughout that May as well. The next time he would be capped for the national side would be in 1989, when he played in two tests against a World Invitation side, both of which the Springboks won.

He was capped twice in 1992, playing at hooker in a test against the All Blacks, which the Springboks lost 24 to 27, as well as a test against the Wallabies, which South Africa also lost, 3 to 26. He was capped five times for South Africa in the subsequent season, playing two tests against France and a three test series against the Wallabies in Australia. He earned four caps in 1994, the year in which he played his last test for South Africa on 26 November at Cardiff Arms Park, in a victory over Wales.

On the field, he was known for rough, even violent play.

Test history

Personal
He moved to Australia in 2006 with his wife and three daughters.  He currently lives and works on the New South Wales Central Coast. He is a qualified medical doctor.

He also did commentary for Supersport.

Accolades
In 2000 he was inducted into the University of Pretoria Sport Hall of fame. Schmidt was named the SA Rugby player of the Year for 1990 and 1991.

See also
List of South Africa national rugby union players – Springbok no. 544

References

External links

Uli Schmidt on genslin.us

1961 births
Living people
Golden Lions players
Rugby union hookers
South Africa international rugby union players
South African expatriate sportspeople in Australia
University of Pretoria alumni
Rugby union players from Pretoria